The 2016 Sarasota Open was a professional tennis tournament played on clay courts. It was the 8th edition of the tournament which was part of the 2016 ATP Challenger Tour. It took place in Sarasota, Florida, United States between 11 and 17 April.

Singles main-draw entrants

Seeds

 1 Rankings are as of April 4, 2016

Other entrants
The following players received wildcards into the singles main draw:
  Sekou Bangoura
  Ernesto Escobedo
  Connor Smith
  Dmitry Tursunov

The following players received entry from the qualifying draw:
  Emilio Gómez
  José Hernández
  Tomás Lipovšek Puches
  Péter Nagy

Champions

Singles

  Mischa Zverev def.  Gerald Melzer, 6–4, 7–6(7–2)

Doubles

  Facundo Argüello /  Nicolás Kicker def.  Marcelo Arévalo /  Sergio Galdós, 4–6, 6–4, [10–6]

References
 Singles Main Draw

External links
Official Website

Sarasota Open
Sarasota Open
2016 in American tennis
2016 in sports in Florida